Tel Aviv University railway station is an Israel Railways station in northern Tel Aviv, Israel. It is officially named Tel Aviv Universita – Merkaz HaYeridim in Hebrew (English: Tel Aviv University – Exhibition Center), due to its proximity to Tel Aviv University and Expo Tel Aviv (the Tel Aviv fairgrounds and convention center, commonly known as Ganei HaTaarucha).

The station has four platforms connected by pedestrian tunnels. It is the northernmost passenger rail station in Tel Aviv; non-stop trains from the station can reach southern Haifa's Hof HaCarmel railway station in about 40 minutes. Outside the station, there is a bus terminal serving the areas adjacent to the university.

In 2019, over six million passengers used the station, making it the fourth-busiest in the country.

Access
The station is located between the lanes of the Ayalon Highway at the Rokah Boulevard interchange. The western entrance is connected to Tel Aviv University by a long stairway, while the eastern entrance allows foot access to the Israel Trade Fairs & Convention Center and to the Yarkon Park. There is a parking facility located near the eastern entrance, between the station and the Trade Fairs Center. The parking facility can be accessed by private transport from Rokah Boulevard or by taking the Exhibition Center exit from the northbound lane of the Ayalon Highway.

A Dan Bus Company terminal is adjacent to the western entrance of the station. It is the terminus of routes 7, 13, 40, 45, 49, 113 and 289, that connect the station to Tel Aviv University and continue further to different parts of Tel Aviv and Gush Dan. On the eastern entrance of the station there is a small bus terminal that contains only the terminus of Dan bus line 8 that operated on rush hours only.On Rokah Boulevard, outside the eastern entrance, are stops of Dan routes 8,  22, 40, 89, 122, 189 and 266 as well as routes from Tel Aviv to Herzliya, Ra'anana and Kfar Saba: 47, 48, 247 of Metropoline Bus Company and 521 of the Egged Bus Cooperative.

Train service

Station layout
Platform numbers increase in a West-to-East direction

Ridership

References

Railway stations in Tel Aviv
Railway stations opened in 2000
2000 establishments in Israel
Railway stations at university and college campuses